Hamilton is a 2006 independent drama film directed by Matthew Porterfield, set and shot in Baltimore, Maryland. The film was screened at several international film festivals, including the Maryland Film Festival. It was released on DVD by The Cinema Guild as part of a two-disc set with Porterfield's second feature, Putty Hill, on November 8, 2011.

Plot
The film's plot deals with two accidental parents and how they manage to work their lives around being premature parents.

Cast
 Christopher H. Myers as Joe
 Stephanie Vizzi as Lena
 Sarah Siepp-Williams as Candace
 Gina Christine Mooers as Linda
 Jasmine Bazinet-Phillips as Courtney
 Megan Clark as April
 Madeleine Saar Reeser as Adeline
 Tiffany Boone as Briana
 Marie Collins as Marie
 Sarah Jane Gerrish as Vicky

Production
Principal photography mostly took place in Baltimore, Maryland.

Release
The film was released at the Wisconsin Film Festival on April 2, 2006.

Home Media
The film was released on DVD on November 8, 2011

Reception
The film has an 83% on Rotten Tomatoes based on 6 reviews. In 2009, the film was named one of the best films of the 2000s by The New Yorker. In 2017, Richard Brody for The New Yorker listed Hamilton as one of the "25 Best Films of the 21st Century So Far."

References

External links
 

2006 films
American independent films
Films set in Baltimore
Films shot in Baltimore
American drama films
2000s English-language films
2000s American films